The 2008 season was Guangzhou FC's first season in the Chinese Super League. This article shows statistics of the club's players in the season, and also lists all matches that the club played in the 2008 season.

First-team squad

Players

Technical staff

Transfers

In

Out

Loan out

Match results

Pre-season and friendlies
{| class="wikitable sortable" style="width:99%;"
|- style="background:#f0f6ff;" 
|-
!Kick-off (GMT+8)
!Opponents
!H / A
!Result
!width=35%|Scorers
|- bgcolor="#ffffdd"
|2008-01-22 
| Yantai Yiteng
|align=center|N
|0–0
|
|- bgcolor="#ffdddd"
|2008-01-23 
| Changchun Yatai
|align=center|N
|0–1
|
|- bgcolor="#ffffdd"
|2008-01-24 
| Wuhan Guanggu
|align=center|N
|0–0
|
|- bgcolor="#ffdddd" 
|2008-01-25 
| Zhejiang Greentown
|align=center|N
|0–1
|
|- bgcolor="#ddffdd"
|2008-01-26 
| Wuhan Guanggu
|align=center|N
|2–1
|
|- bgcolor="#ffffdd"
|2008-01-28 15:30 
| Liaoning Hongyun
|align=center|N
|1–1
|
|- bgcolor="#ddffdd"
|2008-01-30 
| Shanghai Shenhua
|align=center|N
|2–0
|
|- bgcolor="#ffffdd"
|2008-01-31 15:30 
| Shanghai Shenhua
|align=center|N
|1–1
|Jiang Kun 5', Lu Lin 35'
|- bgcolor="#ffdddd"
|2008-02-02 
| Zhejiang Greentown
|align=center|N
|1–4
|
|- bgcolor="#ddffdd"
|2008-02-19 
| Changchun Yatai
|align=center|N
|1–0
|
|- bgcolor="#ffdddd"
|2008-02-29 
| Wuhan Guanggu
|align=center|N
|0–1
|
|- bgcolor="#ffffdd"
|2008-03-04 15:00
| Chongqing Lifan
|align=center|N
|0–0
|
|- bgcolor="#ffdddd"
|2008-03-05 15:00
| Chongqing Lifan
|align=center|N
|0–1
|
|- bgcolor="#ddffdd"
|2008-03-08 15:30
| Perth Glory FC
|align=center|H
|3–1
|Xu Liang 3' (p), Perth Glory FC 19', Xu Liang 45', José Filho Duarte 62'
|- bgcolor="#ffffdd"
|2008-03-24
| Jiangsu Sainty
|align=center|H
|2–2
|
|- bgcolor="#ddffdd"
|2008-04-16
| Guangdong Sunray Cave
|align=center|H
|3–1
|
|- bgcolor="#ffdddd"
|2008-07-23 20:00
| Chelsea FC
|align=center|H
|0–4 
|Salomon Kalou 21', Frank Lampard 50', Franco Di Santo 78', Shaun Wright-Phillips 88|- bgcolor="#ffffdd"
|2008-08-11
| TSW Pegasus FC
|align=center|N
|0–0
|
|- bgcolor="#ddffdd"
|2008-08-13
| South China AA
|align=center|N
|3–1
| 
|- bgcolor="#ddffdd"
|2008-08-21
| Convoy Sun Hei SC
|align=center|N
|2–0
| 
|- bgcolor="#ffffdd"
|2008-08-25 19:00
| South China AA
|align=center|H
|1–1
|Feng Junyan 1', Tales Schutz 88 
|- bgcolor="#ddffdd"
|2008-08-26 16:00
| Guangdong Sunray Cave
|align=center|H
|4–3
|Ramírez, Xu Liang(2), José Duarte / Ye Weichao(2), Cong Tianhao
|}

Chinese Super League 2008

For table see Chinese Super League 2008 Final league table

{| class="wikitable sortable" style="width:99%;"
|- style="background:#f0f6ff;"
!Kick-off (GMT+8)
!Opponents
!H / A
!Result
!Scorers (opponents are indicated in italics)
!Referee
!Attendance
!
|- bgcolor="#ddffdd"
|align=center|2008-03-30 15:30
|Wuhan Guanggu 
|align=center|A
|align=center|3 – 0
|Luis Ramírez 4', Gustavo Saibt Martins 13' , Xu Liang 48', Luis Ramírez 91'
|Fan Qi
|align=center|18,000
|bgcolor=white|2nd  
|- bgcolor="#ffffdd"
|align=center|2008-04-06 15:35
|Shenzhen Xiangxue Eisiti 
|align=center|A
|align=center|1 – 1
|José Duarte 65', Yuan Lin 87', 
|Feng Wenqiang
|align=center|10,000
|bgcolor=white |2nd 
|- bgcolor="ffdddd"
|align=center|2008-04-12 15:35
|Shaanxi Chan-Ba 
|align=center|H
|align=center|0 – 1
|Zhou Lin 82'(OG) 
|Wan Daxue
|align=center|20,000
|bgcolor=white |6th 
|- bgcolor="ffdddd"
|align=center|2008-07-16 19:30
|Beijing Guoan 
|align=center|A
|align=center|2 – 3
|Sui Dongliang 42', Tiago 58', Xu Liang 65'(p), Tao Wei 77',Gao Ming 87'
|Huang Junjie
|align=center|20,000
|bgcolor=white |12th 
|- bgcolor="#ddffdd"
|align=center|2008-04-27 15:35
|Liaoning Hongyun 
|align=center|A
|align=center|2 – 0
|Luis Ramírez 21', Diego 29'
|Huang Yejun
|align=center|10,000
|bgcolor=white |10th 
|- bgcolor="#ddffdd"
|align=center|2008-05-03 15:35
|Changchun Yatai 
|align=center|H
|align=center|3 – 2
|Xu Liang 36', Diego 45',Guillaume Dah Zadi 70',José Duarte 74',Guillaume Dah Zadi 92'+
|Wan Daxue
|align=center|20,000
|bgcolor=white|6th 
|- bgcolor="#90EE90"
|align=center|2008-05-10 15:30
|Dalian Haichang 
|align=center|H
|align=center|3 – 0
|Diego 15', Luis Ramírez 41', Wu Pingfeng 71'
|Sun Baojie
|align=center|22,000
|bgcolor=white|3rd 
|- bgcolor="ffdddd"
|align=center|2008-05-17 19:30
|Zhejiang Greentown 
|align=center|H
|align=center|1 – 3
|Cai Chuchuan 49', Karim Benounes67', Cai Chuchuan 80',José Duarte 89'
|Li Yuhong
|align=center|20,000
|bgcolor=white |6th 
|- bgcolor="ffdddd"
|align=center|2008-09-06 15:35
|Shanghai Shenhua
|align=center|H
|align=center|0 – 1
|Emil Martínez 34'''
|Tan Hai
|align=center|15,000
|bgcolor=white |6th
|- bgcolor="ffdddd"
|align=center|2008-06-25 19:30
|Tianjin Teda 
|align=center|A
|align=center|0 – 2
|Mariko Daouda 35', Éber Luís 51 
|Huang Junjie
|align=center|15,000
|bgcolor=white |8th 
|- bgcolor="#ddffdd"
|align=center|2008-06-28 15:35
|Qingdao Jonoon 
|align=center|H
|align=center|3 – 2
|Xu Liang 21', Lu Lin 27',Hu Jun 45', Qu Bo 53',Feng Junyan 96'+
|Tao Rancheng
|align=center|18,000
|bgcolor=white|5th 
|- bgcolor="ffdddd"
|align=center|2008-07-03 19:30
|Changsha Ginde 
|align=center|A
|align=center|2 – 4
|Aboubakar Oumarou 17', Aboubakar Oumarou 48'+, Zhang Chenglin 51', Luis Ramírez 75',Yu Guijun 79', Tang Dechao 85'
|Zhang Zhengping
|align=center|8,000
|bgcolor=white |8th 
|- bgcolor="#ffffdd"
|align=center|2008-07-06 19:30
|Chengdu Blades 
|align=center|H
|align=center|1 – 1
|Xu Liang 51', Liu Cheng 93'+ 
|Huang Junjie
|align=center|22,000
|bgcolor=white |8th 
|- bgcolor="ffdddd"
|align=center|2008-07-12 19:30
|Henan Construction 
|align=center|A
|align=center|0 – 2
|Qiao Wei 17', Josen 49 
|Li Yunhong
|align=center|25,000
|bgcolor=white |11th 
|- bgcolor="#ddffdd"
|align=center|2008-08-30 15:35
|Shandong Luneng 
|align=center|H
|align=center|1 – 0
|Luis Ramírez 64'
|Zhang Lei
|align=center|20,000
|bgcolor=white|9th 
|- bgcolor="#ddffdd"
|align=center|2008-09-13 15:35
|Wuhan Guanggu 
|align=center|H
|align=center|3 – 0
|Deng Zhuoxiang 4', Luis Ramírez 22', Luis Ramírez 34'
|Tao Rancheng
|align=center|21,000
|bgcolor=white|6th 
|- bgcolor="#ddffdd"
|align=center|2008-09-20 15:35
|Shenzhen Xiangxue Eisiti 
|align=center|H
|align=center|1 – 0
|Feng Junyan 54'
|Zhang Lei
|align=center|20,000
|bgcolor=white|6th
|- bgcolor="#ffffdd"
|align=center|2008-09-27 15:35
|Shaanxi Chan-Ba 
|align=center|A
|align=center|1 – 1
|Wu Pingfeng 22', Ronny 37', 
|Wang Xueqing
|align=center|11,000
|bgcolor=white |6th 
|- bgcolor="#ffffdd"
|align=center|2008-10-02 15:35
|Beijing Guoan 
|align=center|H
|align=center|1 – 1
|Walter Martínez 3', Diego 71',
|Tao Rancheng
|align=center|22,000
|bgcolor=white |6th
|- bgcolor="ffdddd"
|align=center|2008-10-05 15:35
|Liaoning Hongyun 
|align=center|H
|align=center|1 – 2
|Ryan Griffiths 9', Raman Kirenkin 79', Diego 87'
|Li Yuhong
|align=center|10,000
|bgcolor=white |8th  
|- bgcolor="#FFAAAA"
|align=center|2008-10-11 15:30
|Changchun Yatai 
|align=center|A
|align=center|0 – 6
|Wang Dong 7', Guillaume Dah Zadi 26', Liu Weidong 31', Wang Dong 65', Samuel Caballero 84', Chen Lei 90'|Xu Hang
|align=center|5,000
|bgcolor=white|8th
|- bgcolor="#ffffdd"
|align=center|2008-10-18 15:35
|Dalian Haichang 
|align=center|A
|align=center|1 – 1
|Feng Junyan 12', Georgi Chilikov 91'+, 
|Fan Qi
|align=center|4,000
|bgcolor=white |9th 
|- bgcolor="#ffffdd"
|align=center|2008-10-22 19:30
|Zhejiang Greentown 
|align=center|A
|align=center|0 – 0
|
|Wang Jin
|align=center|7,894
|bgcolor=white |9th
|- bgcolor="ffdddd"
|align=center|2008-10-26 19:45
|Shanghai Shenhua 
|align=center|A
|align=center|2 – 3
|Luis Ramírez 18', Diego 36', Du Wei 41', Hamilton Ricard 51', Erick Scott 59 
|Fan Qi
|align=center|10,956
|bgcolor=white |9th
|- bgcolor="#ddffdd"
|align=center|2008-11-02 15:35
|Tianjin Teda 
|align=center|H
|align=center|4 – 3
|Li Yan 13', Luis Ramírez 51',Éber Luís 77',Luis Ramírez 79', Lu Lin 85',Wu Weian 87'(p), Hao Junmin 92'+
| Krishnan
|align=center|18,000
|bgcolor=white|9th
|- bgcolor="#ffffdd"
|align=center|2008-11-09 15:30
|Qingdao Jonoon 
|align=center|A
|align=center|0 – 0
|
|Zhang Lei
|align=center|5,000
|bgcolor=white |9th
|- bgcolor="#ffffdd"
|align=center|2008-11-12 15:30
|Changsha Ginde 
|align=center|H
|align=center|0 – 0
|
|Huang Junjie
|align=center|21,000
|bgcolor=white |9th
|- bgcolor="#ffffdd"
|align=center|2008-11-16 15:30
|Chengdu Blades 
|align=center|A
|align=center|1 – 1
|Shi Jun 76', Shi Jun 93'+(OG)
|Wang Jin
|align=center|5,000
|bgcolor=white |9th 
|- bgcolor="#ddffdd"
|align=center|2008-11-23 15:30
|Henan Construction 
|align=center|H
|align=center|4 – 2
|Emmanuel Olisadebe 10', Xu Liang 21', Luis Ramírez 35'(p), Bai Lei 67',Wang Shouting 81',Xu Liang 86'
|Li Jun
|align=center|25,360
|bgcolor=white|8th 
|- bgcolor="#ffffdd"
|align=center|2008-11-30 15:30
|Shandong Luneng 
|align=center|A
|align=center|0 – 0
|
|Li Yuhong
|align=center|38,393
|bgcolor=white |7th 
|}

 Wuhan Guanggu have withdrawn from the league. All matches were counted as 0–3 defeats.
 Match was postponed from 14 May to 17 May, for Wenchuan earthquake in Sichuan Province on 12 May.
 Match was moved from Hangzhou to Guangzhou for the time confliction with 2008 Summer Olympics torch relay in Hangzhou.
 Match was postponed from 18 May to 6 September.

Squad statistics

U19 Team

Technical staff

U19 League Results

U19 League Table

P = Position; Pld = Matches played; W = Matches won; D = Match(es) drawn; L = Match(es) lost; GF = Goals for; GA = Goals against; GD = Goal difference; Pts = Points;

U19 Winners' Cup

The competition was held from 12 October to 22 October in Changzhou, Jiangsu Province.

Champions: Jiangsu FA U19s
Runners-up: Hebei FA U19s
3rd place: Guangzhou Pharmaceutical U19s'''

References

Guangzhou Pharmaceutical
2008